Aspidiotini is a tribe of armored scale insects.

Genera

Abgrallaspis
Acanthaspidiotus
Acutaspis
Affirmaspis
Africonidia
Anaspidiotus
Anastomoderma
Aonidia
Aonidiella
Arundaspis
Aspidaspis
Aspidiella
Aspidioides
Aspidiotus
Aspidonymus
Avidovaspis
Banahaoa
Cephalaspidiotus
Chemnaspidiotus
Chentraspis
Chinaspis
Chortinaspis
Chrysomphalus
Clavaspidiotus
Clavaspis
Crassaspidiotus
Crenulaspidiotus
Cryptaspidiotus
Cryptophyllaspsis
Cupressaspis
Diaonidia
Diaphoraspis
Diaspidiotus
Diaspidopus
Diastolaspis
Dichosoma
Diclavaspis
Duplaspidiotus
Dynaspidiotus
Entaspidiotus
Ephedraspis
Eremiaspis
Eulaingia
Felixiella
Fisanotargionia
Furcaspis
Genistaspis
Gomphaspidiotus
Gonaspidiotus
Greeniella
Greenoidea
Helaspis
Hemiberlesia
Hemigymnaspis
Hypaspidiotus
Icaraspidiotus
Lindingaspis
Loranthaspis
Marginaspis
Maskellia
Megaspidiotus
Melanaspis
Mesoselenaspidus
Metaspidiotus
Mimeraspis
Monaonidiella
Morganella
Murataspis
Mycetaspis
Myrtophila
Neoclavaspis
Neofurcaspis
Neoleonardia
Neomorgania
Neoselenaspidus
Nigridiaspis
Nuculaspis
Obtusaspis
Oceanaspidiotus
Octaspidiotus
Operculaspis
Palinaspis
Paraonidia
Paraonidiella
Paraselenaspidus
Parrottia
Phaspis
Phaulaspis
Pseudaonidia
Pseudaonidiella
Pseudischnaspis
Pseudomelanaspis
Pseudoselenaspidus
Pseudotargionia
Pygidiaspis
Quadraspidiotus
Reclavaspis
Remotaspidiotus
Rhizaspidiotus
Rungaspis
Sadaotakagia
Saharaspis
Sakalavaspis
Schizaspis
Schizentaspidus
Schizotargionia
Selenaspidopsis
Selenaspidus
Selenediella
Selenomphalos
Semelaspidus
Separaspis
Spinaspidiotus
Stringaspidiotus
Sudanaspis
Taiwanaspidiotus
Targaspidiotus
Targionia
Targionidea
Temnaspidiotus
Tollaspidiotus
Tsimanaspis
Tsugaspidiotus
Unaspidiotus
Varicaspis

References

 
Aspidiotinae
Hemiptera tribes